The Go-Getter is a 1956 American comedy film directed by Leigh Jason and Leslie Goodwins and starring Hank McCune, Hanley Stafford and Beverly Garland.

Cast
 Hank McCune as Henry R. 'Hank' McCune
 Hanley Stafford as 	Lester Mayberry
 Thurston Hall as Mr. Higgins
 Ray Collins as J.P. Miller 
 Beverly Garland as Peggy, Mayberry's Secretary
 Andrew Tombes as 	Mr. Symington	
 Mary Treen as 	Miss Wellington, aptitude tester
 Gene Roth as Head File Clerk
 Arthur Q. Bryan as 	The Handyman
 Maurice Cass as 	Elderly Professor
 Ellen Corby as The Maid
 Douglass Dumbrille as 	Dr. Baker
 Tom Powers as Miller's Business Partner
 Veola Vonn as 	A Clerk

References

Bibliography
 Verswijver, Leo. "Movies Were Always Magical": Interviews with 19 Actors, Directors, and Producers from the Hollywood of the 1930s through the 1950s. McFarland, 2003.

External links
 

1956 films
1956 comedy films
American comedy films
Films directed by Leigh Jason
Films directed by Leslie Goodwins
1950s English-language films
1950s American films
American black-and-white films